Shorshe ilish is a Bengali dish, native to the Bengal region of the Indian subcontinent, made from hilsa or Tenualosa ilisha, a type of herring, cooked in mustard gravy. The dish is popular among the people of Bangladesh where the fish is mainly found and in the neighbouring Indian states of West Bengal, Tripura and Assam's Barak valley.

Ingredients 
The main ingredients are hilsa, white mustard, mustard, mustard oil, green chili, black cumin, turmeric powder, red chili powder and salt. Lime juice and/or coriander leaves may be added for flavor.

Variation 
Shorshe ilish bhapa is a variation of this dish.

Nutrition 
Each serving contains approximately 450 calories, 17.1g protein, 8.1g carbohydrate, 38.4g total fat (4.9g saturated), 73.5 mg cholesterol, and 8.2 mg sodium.

See also
 Bangladeshi cuisine
 North Indian cuisine
 List of fish dishes

References

External links
 No tomatoes? No problem!
 http://www.mid-day.com/articles/savour-authentic-bengali-food-at-this-powai-eatery/15470182
 Hilsa for PM Singh? Share your recipes!

Bengali cuisine
Indian fish dishes
Bangladeshi fish dishes